The 2008 United States Senate election in Delaware was held on November 4, 2008. Incumbent Democratic U.S. Senator Joe Biden, who was also the Democratic nominee for vice president in the concurrent presidential election, faced Christine O'Donnell in the general election. Biden won re-election to a seventh term with 64.69% of the vote, his best performing result in his senatorial career, while also being elected vice president. Biden took his oath of office in the Senate chamber with the rest of his colleagues on January 3, 2009, but resigned his seat on January 15, 2009, and assumed the vice presidency five days later.

Candidates

Democratic 
 Joe Biden, incumbent U.S. Senator (unopposed)

Republican 
 Christine O'Donnell, media consultant and political analyst
 Tim Smith, businessman

General election

Campaign 
After ending his 2008 presidential bid in January 2008, Biden focused instead on running for a seventh Senate term. He was unopposed within his party.

O'Donnell faced businessman Tim Smith at the Republican state party convention and won with more than 60 percent of the  delegate vote.

On August 23, 2008, Democratic Party presidential nominee Barack Obama announced that he had selected Biden to serve as his vice presidential running mate. Under Delaware law, Biden could run simultaneously for both his Senate seat and for vice president, which he decided to do.

The statewide party primary elections were held September 9, 2008. O'Donnell was uncontested in the Republican primary, as was Biden in the Democratic primary.

O'Donnell tried to make an issue of Biden's dual campaigns, claiming that serving his constituents was not important to him, and criticized his unwillingness to participate in debates and candidate forums. Nevertheless, she was heavily outspent by Biden and her campaign failed to gain traction. Her campaign ended with $23,000 in debt.

Minutes after the polls closed on November 4, NBC called the race for Biden, with other news organizations soon following.

Predictions

Polling

Results

County results

Subsequent events 
After being sworn in on January 3, Biden resigned as senator on January 15 in order to become vice president on January 20. Delaware Governor Ruth Ann Minner appointed Ted Kaufman, a Democrat, to fill the vacant seat until a special election in 2010. O'Donnell once again ran unsuccessfully for the seat; she was defeated by Democrat Chris Coons.

See also 
 2008 United States Senate elections

References

External links 
 Delaware Commissioner of Elections
 Delaware U.S. Senate from OurCampaigns.com
 Campaign contributions for Delaware congressional races from OpenSecrets

2008
Delaware
United States Senate
s